Institute of Acoustics may refer to:

 Institute of Acoustics, Chinese Academy of Sciences, a Chinese government research establishment
 Institute of Acoustics (United Kingdom), a British professional engineering institution